António Manuel Fernandes da Silva Ribeiro is a Portuguese Admiral who currently serves as the Chief of the General Staff of the Portuguese Armed Forces since 1 March 2018.

Education, Academic Accomplishments and Memberships
Riberio joined the Naval School in 1974, and was promoted to midshipman prior to his graduation in 1978. He also holds a Degree in Hydrography and post-graduate studies including a master's degree in Strategic Studies, a Doctorate in Political Science and Aggregation in Strategic Studies. He has completed various courses locally and abroad, such as the Naval Warfare General Course, the Naval Warfare Complementary Course and the Flag Officer's Promotion Course. He also serves as a professor with aggregation in Strategic Studies at the Social and Political Sciences Institute, and at the Portuguese Naval Academy.

He is a member of:

 Strategic Reflection Group of the National Defense Institute
 Center for Marine Studies
 Combatants League
 Security, Organized Crime and Terrorism Observatory
 Portuguese Center for Geopolitics
 Portuguese Military History Commission
 Naval Military Club
 Nautical Club of Navy Officers and Cadets
 Olivença Friends Group
 International Relations Magazine
 Military Sciences Magazine

He also serves as a member and a contributor to major defense magazines, such as the Military Magazine, the Nation and Defense Magazine, and the Security and Defense Magazine.

Military Background

During his junior years, he served as the Deputy Chief of the Navigation Service aboard the NRP São Gabriel (A5206) and also served as an executive officer aboard the NRP Save (P1161). 

He served as the Head of the Navigation Service of NRP Comandante João Belo (F480), and became the Head of the Technical-Naval Studies Center, and also served as a Representative in the Portuguese Association of Water and Hydraulic Resources.

He also served as the Deputy of the Technical Director for the Cooperation with Portuguese-speaking African Countries, Head of the Nautical Publications Section, Deputy of the Head of the Coastal Dynamics Division at the Portuguese Hydrographic Institute. He also served as the commanding officer of the NRP Andromeda (A5203) and as Deputy of the Chief of the Department of Strategic and Military Studies at the General Directorate of National Defense Policy.

He also became the Head of the Forces Planning Section at the Planning Division of the Naval Staff, became an Adviser at the National Defense Institute, Director of Research and Operations at the Strategic Defense and Military Information Service, and served as the commanding officer of the NRP Almeida Carvalho (A527). He also served as the General Director, Portuguese Hydrographic Institute, became the Coordinator of the Strategy Department and professor of Strategy and Strategic Planning at the Superior Naval War Institute, and became the Head of the Planning Division at the Naval Staff.

He also served as the General Director of the Maritime Authority System and as Commander of the Maritime Police. He also became the Superintendent of Material, the General Director of the Hydrographic Institute, the Deputy Vice-Chief of the Naval Staff, the Secretary of the Admiralty Council and also served as a Member of the Consultative Commission on Search and Rescue. He also served as the Chief of the Naval Staff of the Portuguese Navy, before  he was appointed by President Marcelo Rebelo de Sousa as the Chief of the General Staff on March 1, 2018, replacing Army General Artur Neves Pina Monteiro.

Awards
His awards, commendations and honors from military service include:
  Grand Officer, Order of Aviz
  Commander, Brazilian Order of Naval Merit
  Brazilian Medal of Merit Tamandaré
  Officer, Ordre national du Mérite
  Gold, French National Defence Medal
  Order of Timor-Leste
 6 Distinguished Service Medals
 1st and 2nd Class, Military Merit Medals
 2nd and 3rd Class, Naval Cross Medals
 Vasco da Gama's Naval Medal
 Gold and Silver, Exemplary Conduct Medal 
 Gold, Prestige and Career Medal(awarded by the City Hall of Pombal)
 20 August 2022 – Medal of Merit (East Timor)

Commendations and other honors
He also received numerous honors and commendations from various cities, organizations, and institutions, such as:
 Honorary Citizen of Gulfport, Mississippi
 1992 Medal from the Journal "Revista Militar" (for his outstanding contribution to the prestige and projection of that institution)
 Admiral Barroso 1995 and 1996 of the Naval Military Club
 Admiral Pereira Crespo 1999 of the Journal "Revista da Armada"
 Admiral Augusto Osório 2000 of the Naval Military Club
 Commander Joaquim Costa 2001 of the journal "Revista da Armada"
 National Defense 2004 from the Minister of National Defense.

Personal life
He currently lives at Seixal. He is also married and has two sons.

References

Portuguese military officers
Recipients of the Order of Timor-Leste
Living people
1957 births